Charles Ogden is a pen name used by a collection of authors at Star Farm Productions for the Edgar & Ellen book series for children and young adults.   The pen name is credited with nine books (with a tenth upcoming), published by both Tricycle Press, and more recently, Simon & Schuster. The illustrator for the series is Rick Carton of Chicago, Illinois.

It is stated that he is an avid camper and fisherman who loves to travel. Apparently, he’s been to both the North and South poles, and Poland. Upon contacting the company that drives his books, Star Farm Productions (out of Chicago), say he is currently on Sabbatical in the Amazon with his type writer and a net (one of his many hobbies includes collecting rare bugs). His book, Nod's Limbs, is the only one not published in the UK or Australia.

Rare Beasts is about the twins, Edgar and Ellen, who live alone in a dilapidated mansion on the edge of the town, Nod's Limbs. Their parents disappeared years ago, and now they spend their days avoiding Heimertz, the accordion-playing groundskeeper, pestering Pet, their hairball companion, and wreaking havoc on the ultra-sweet, too-good-to-be-true townsfolk. However, their havoc wreaking has incurred expenses... so the twins decide to fund raise by nabbing the pets of Nod's Limbs and transforming them into exotic animals worth millions.  These two anti-heroes get their just desert in the end.

Tourist Trap is about how Mayor Knightleigh announces that he wants to build a luxury hotel on the site of Edgar and Ellen's beloved Gadget Graveyard.  When the mayor invites a group of celebrities to Nod's Limbs for a French toast festival. The twins use their cleverness to send the tourists packing the other way so they can save their home.

Books
Rare Beasts 2003 
Tourist Trap 2004 
Under Town 2004 
Pet's Revenge 2006 
High Wire 2006 
Nod's Limbs 2007 
Mischief Manual 2007 
Hot Air 2008 
Frost Bites November 2008
Split Ends January 2009

External links

21st-century American novelists
American horror writers
Ogden, Charles
21st-century pseudonymous writers